The RVers is a weekly documentary television series about the recreational vehicle lifestyle produced by the producers of The Aviators. It premiered in November 2019 on Discovery Channel with season 2 premiering relatively shortly afterwards in May 2020.

External links
 
Article in RV Travel

2019 American television series debuts
2019 Canadian television series debuts
2010s American documentary television series
English-language television shows
2010s Canadian documentary television series